Earl of Puddlestone is a 1940 American comedy film directed by Gus Meins and written by Ewart Adamson and Val Burton. The film stars James Gleason, Lucile Gleason, Russell Gleason, Harry Davenport, Lois Ranson and Tommy Ryan. The film was released on August 31, 1940, by Republic Pictures.

Plot

Cast 
James Gleason as Joe Higgins
Lucile Gleason as Lil Higgins
Russell Gleason as Sidney Higgins
Harry Davenport as Grandpa Ed Carson
Lois Ranson as Betty Higgins
Tommy Ryan as Tommy Higgins
Eric Blore as Horatio Bottomley
Betty Blythe as Millicent Potter-Potter
Forrester Harvey as Tittington
William Halligan as Henry Potter-Potter
Mary Ainslee as Marian Potter-Potter
William Brady as Bill Connolly
Ben Carter as Homer
James C. Morton as Officer Brannigan
Aubrey Mather as Lord Stoke-Newington
Mary Kenyon as Judith

References

External links
 

1940 films
American comedy films
1940 comedy films
Republic Pictures films
Films directed by Gus Meins
Films scored by William Lava
Films produced by Gus Meins
American black-and-white films
1940s English-language films
1940s American films